Major André Gilbert Kempster,  (26 October 1916 – 21 August 1943), born André Gilberto Coccioletti, was awarded the George Cross posthumously "...in recognition of most conspicuous gallantry in carrying out hazardous work in a very brave manner" for an act of self-sacrifice in Algeria during the Second World War.

21 August 1943
On 21 August 1943, near Philippeville [Skikda], Major Kempster was instructing two fellow soldiers how to throw hand grenades from a practice pit. A grenade, which had been thrown by Major Kempster, rolled back into the pit. He attempted to scoop the grenade out of the pit but failed to do so. By this time detonation was due. Without hesitation Major Kempster threw himself on the grenade just before it exploded and received fatal injuries. This act undoubtedly saved the lives of the two other occupants of the pit.

George Cross citation
Kempster's George Cross citation appeared in the London Gazette on 9 November 1943:

Sale of medal
Major Kempster's George Cross was sold by Spinks on 28 March 1995 for an expected price of £2,800 – £3,200.

References

External links
André Gilbert Kempster on the George Cross database

1916 births
1943 deaths
People educated at Cheltenham College
Duke of Wellington's Regiment officers
British recipients of the George Cross
British Army personnel killed in World War II
Royal Armoured Corps officers
Military personnel from London